Pablo de Porturas y Landázuri was a Spanish Hidalgo accountant and treasurer of the Viceroyalty of Perú administration.

Porturas y Landázuri was born in the town of Subijana-Morillas in the province of Álava, Basque Country in 1748. 
He was son of Juan de Gordóniz Porturas y Latatu and Josepha Ortiz de Landazuri y Arriaga. He married Juana Paula del Corral y Aranda in 1800 and died in Lima, Viceroyalty of Perú in 1818.

He worked as a visitor of the Arequipa Royal Treasury Office, accountant of the Trujillo Royal Treasury Office, accountant of the Cuzco Royal Treasury Office and treasurer minister of the Lima Royal Treasury Office.

References

1748 births
1818 deaths
People from Álava
Spanish politicians
18th-century Spanish people